The Brussels Ring (Dutch: Grote ring rond Brussel, French: Ring de Bruxelles) numbered R0, is a ring road surrounding the city of Brussels as well as other smaller towns south of Brussels. While most of it is classified as a motorway (highway), part of it (in the Forêt de Soignes/Zoniënwoud) is merely an express route.

The clockwise carriageway is referred to as the inner ring (ring intérieur in French, binnenring in Dutch), while the anticlockwise carriageway is referred to as the outer ring (ring extérieur in French, buitenring in Dutch).

The first sections of the road were built in the late 1950s, but the main part was built during the 1970s, with the end of construction in 1978. The Brussels Ring has interchanges with the European routes E40 (at the Groot-Bijgaarden and Sint-Stevens-Woluwe interchanges), E19 (at the Machelen and Ittre interchanges), E411 (at the Leonard crossroads), and E429 (at the Halle interchange). It also has interchanges with national highways A12 (at the Strombeek-Bever interchange) and A201 (at the Zaventem interchange).

Course 
The Strombeek-Bever interchange with the A12 is located in Grimbergen municipality. Going clockwise from there, the ring then crosses the municipalities of City of Brussels, Vilvoorde, Machelen, Zaventem, Kraainem, Wezembeek-Oppem, Tervuren, Auderghem/Oudergem, Watermael-Boitsfort/Watermaal-Bosvoorde, Hoeilaart, Waterloo, Braine-l'Alleud, Braine-le-Château, Halle, Beersel, Drogenbos, Forest, Sint-Pieters-Leeuw, Anderlecht, Dilbeek, Asse and Wemmel. In all the ring crosses 15 municipalities in Flanders, 5 in the Brussels region, and 3 in Wallonia.

Ramps 

As well as having 8 interchanges with other highways, the Brussels Ring has 27 ramps (junctions), numbered counterclockwise from 1 to 27:

 Ramp 1, also known as Quatre Bras/Vier Armen, leads to Tervuren
 Ramp 2 leads to Wezembeek-Oppem, Kraainem and UCL Saint-Luc hospital
 Ramp 3, also known as Zaventem-Henneaulaan, leads to Diegem and Zaventem
 Ramp 4 leads to Diegem-Woluwelaan, Vilvoorde, Evere and Zaventem
 Ramp 5 leads to Machelen
 Ramp 6 leads to Koningslo-Vilvoorde
 Ramp 7 leads to Grimbergen
 Ramp 8 leads to Wemmel, Expo, Strombeek-Bever, Laeken, A12-Willebroek
 Ramp 9 leads to Jette, Brugmann hospital and Merchtem
 Ramp 10 leads to Zellik, Aalst, Brussels, N9-Asse
 Ramp 11 leads to Sint-Agatha-Berchem and Groot-Bijgaarden
 Ramp 12 leads to Dilbeek
 Ramp 13 leads to Dilbeek, N8-Ninove, Sint-Jans-Molenbeek
 Ramp 14 leads to Anderlecht and Moortebeek
 Ramp 15 leads to Anderlecht and Pede
 Ramp 16 leads to Anderlecht and Sint-Pieters-Leeuw
 Ramp 17 leads to Anderlecht-Industries and Brussels-Centre
 Ramp 18 leads to Ruisbroek, Drogenbos and Uccle-Stalle
 Ramp 19 leads to Lot and Beersel
 Ramp 20 leads to Huizingen and Alsemberg
 Ramp 21 leads to Halle and E429 Lille-Tournai
 Ramp 22 leads to Wauthier-Braine, Tubize and Waterloo
 Ramp 23 leads to Ophain and Braine-l'Alleud
 Ramp 24 leads to Nivelles, Lillois, Braine-l'Alleud and Parc de l'Alliance
 Ramp 25 leads to Genappe, Braine-l'Alleud
 Ramp 26 leads to Mont-Saint-Jean
 Ramp 27 leads to Waterloo-Centre

References
 Wegen-Routes

R0
Ring
Ring roads in Belgium